Nordseewerke Emden GmbH (sometimes abbreviated NSWE, in English: North Sea Company) was a shipbuilding company, located in the Emden Harbor of the north German city of Emden. Founded in 1903, shipbuilding ended in 2010, and the company was taken over by the Schaaf Industrie AG, which among other products, makes components for off-shore systems.

The shipyard employed some 1,400 people in 2010 and was the second-largest employer in Emden, following the plant of the Volkswagen automotive company. Today only few of the former coworkers of the shipyard are still employed with the new owner Schaaf, which also went insolvent in 2012.

History 
Nordseewerke was founded on March 11, 1903, and was one of the oldest among the still-existing shipyards in Germany. Its successor was the Schaaf Industrie AG. The company built merchant ships of all categories, but also ships for the Kaiserliche Marine during World War I, the Kriegsmarine later, and today's modern Deutsche Marine.

In the past 20 years, submarines were also exported to South Africa, Argentina, and Israel.

Besides container and other freight-carrying ships, Nordseewerke also built naval vessels. In 1971, the cruise liner Sea Venture (later renamed the Pacific Princess) was constructed. The ship is well known as the film location of The Love Boat.

Submarines (U-boats) 
 Type 207 submarines
 Type 1700 submarines
 Type 210 submarines

Ships built by Nordseewerke (selection)
 1915/1916, first construction of minesweepers for Kaiserliche Marine (M13 and M14)
 1915–1917, construction of 10 fishing vessels  (among them Geier, Bielefeld, Münster), all used as outpost-ships during World War I
 1920, 14,000 t tanker Baltic for the Deutsch-Amerikanische Petroleum AG (DAPG), largest ship built by NSWE at that time
 1922, construction of a floating dock for Argentina
 1931, ore-transport ship Odin for the Hamburger Seereederei Frigga
 1931, 17,500 t tanker J. H. Senior for the Baltisch Amerikanische Petroleum Import GmbH in Danzig
 1973, Four container-carrier SeaTrain in US with gas-turbine propulsion, worldwide fastest merchant ships at that time
 1976, Constr.No.399, freighter Aegir for the Seereederei Frigga; altogether NSWE built 23 ships for this company between 1921 and 1968
 1977, CNo.455, combined ore-oil freighter Saggat for a Swedish company
 1979, BACO-LINER 1, a new developed concept barge/container-ship (BACO = BArges und COntainer); followed BACO-LINER 2 and BACO-LINER 3
 1983, CNo. 464, F 122  ; followed 1990 frigate 
 1986, reconstruction of the Soviet icebreaker  with new technology (among them Thyssen-Waas Bow and Air Bubble System); followed icebreaker Kapitan Sorokin
 1994–1996, CNo.469, F 123   for the German Navy
 1999, CNo. 525, suction dredge Vasco da Gama for Belgium Jan de Nul Offshore-Company, worldwide greatest suction dredge at that time
 1999,   for the Israeli Navy; altogether 3 units of this class were built at NSWE (Dolphin,  and )
 2001, CNo. 521, F 124   in cooperation with Blohm & Voss and HDW (ARGE F 124) for the German Navy
 December 2009, launching of container carrier Frisia Cottbus, last ship of NSWE

References 

Hans Jürgen Witthöft, 100 Jahre Nordseewerke, Edition Schiff & Hafen Bd. 6, Seehafen Verlag, Hamburg 2004,

External links 

 Company homepage
 U-boats built by Nordseewerke during WWII
 ThyssenKrupp base information about Nordseewerke

Shipbuilding companies of Germany
Vehicle manufacturing companies established in 1903
Military vehicle manufacturers
Defence companies of Germany
Industry in Lower Saxony